Allunhari is a town in eastern Gambia. It is located in Fulladu East District in the Upper River Division.  As of 2008, it has an estimated population of 5,573.

References

Populated places in the Gambia
Upper River Division